Syllepte erebarcha is a moth in the family Crambidae. It was described by Edward Meyrick in 1939. It is found in the Democratic Republic of the Congo.

References

Moths described in 1939
erebarcha
Moths of Africa
Endemic fauna of the Democratic Republic of the Congo
Taxa named by Edward Meyrick